Behçet Türkmen (9 May 1899 – 16 December 1968) was a Turkish soldier and intelligence officer.

He graduated from the Turkish Military Academy. On 1 September 1931, he was appointed chief of staff to the National Police Service Race. Later he served in the Turkish Armed Forces at various levels. He was appointed head of the National Police with the rank of major general on 3 September 1953 and remained in the post until 27 March 1957 with the rank of lieutenant general. The same year he was appointed to the Baghdad Embassy and later to the Oslo Embassy.

He was the father of İlter Türkmen, who served as the minister of foreign affairs in the cabinet led by Bülent Ulusu which was established following the 1980 coup.

References

1899 births
1968 deaths
Ambassadors of Turkey to Iraq
Ambassadors of Turkey to Norway
Turkish generals